Laboso is a surname. Notable people with the surname include:

Joyce Laboso (1960—2019), Kenyan politician 
Lorna Laboso (1961–2008), Kenyan politician, sister of Joyce